Charles Hoffman (September 28, 1911, San Francisco, California – April 8, 1972, Los Angeles, California) was a film and television writer and film producer.

His writing credits include That Hagen Girl (1947), The Blue Gardenia (1953), and the 1960s television series Batman and The Green Hornet.

External links

American television writers
American male screenwriters
American film producers
1911 births
1972 deaths
American male television writers
20th-century American businesspeople
20th-century American male writers
20th-century American screenwriters